811 Nauheima is a minor planet orbiting the Sun. It was named after Bad Nauheim, a spa town in western Germany.

References

External links
 
 

000811
Discoveries by Max Wolf
Named minor planets
000811
19150908